Narcis de Carreras i Guiteras (1905, in La Bisbal d'Empordà — 1991, in Barcelona) was a Spanish lawyer and president of FC Barcelona.

Politically close to the Catalan Regionalist League in his youth (he was personal secretary of Francesc Cambó), he chaired FC Barcelona between 1968 and 1969 (he coined the phrase "Barça is more than a club", which would later be adopted as motto, "mes que un club") and became president of La Caixa in 1972, after the death of Miquel Mateu i Pla. In 1987, he was replaced by Juan Antonio Samaranch to run the savings bank.

Trophies won by club during Narcís de Carreras presidency

Copa del Rey (1):
1967–68

References
Carreras at the FCB.com

FC Barcelona presidents
Lawyers from Barcelona
1905 births
1991 deaths